The following is a list of English words without rhymes, called refractory rhymes—that is, a list of words in the English language that rhyme with no other English word. The word "rhyme" here is used in the strict sense, called a perfect rhyme, that the words are pronounced the same from the vowel of the main stressed syllable onwards. The list was compiled from the point of view of Received Pronunciation (with a few exceptions for General American), and may not work for other accents or dialects. Multiple-word rhymes (a phrase that rhymes with a word, known as a phrasal or mosaic rhyme), self-rhymes (adding a prefix to a word and counting it as a rhyme of itself), imperfect rhymes (such as purple with circle), and identical rhymes (words that are identical in their stressed syllables, such as bay and obey) are often not counted as true rhymes and have not been considered. Only the list of one-syllable words can hope to be anything near complete; for polysyllabic words, rhymes are the exception rather than the rule.

Definition of perfect rhyme
Following the strict definition of rhyme, a perfect rhyme demands the exact match of all sounds from the last stressed vowel to the end of the word. Therefore, words with the stress far from the end are more likely to have no perfect rhymes. For instance, a perfect rhyme for discomBOBulate would have to rhyme three syllables, -OBulate. There are many words that match most of the sounds from the stressed vowel onwards and so are near rhymes, called slant rhymes. Ovulate, copulate, and populate, for example, vary only slightly in one consonant from discombobulate, and thus provide very usable rhymes for most situations in which a rhyme for discombobulate is desired. However, no other English word has exactly these three final syllables with this stress pattern. And since in most traditions the stressed syllable should not be identical—the consonant before the stressed vowel should be different—adding a prefix to a word, as be-elbow for elbow, does not create a perfect rhyme for it.

Words that rhyme in one accent or dialect may not rhyme in another. In the other direction, iron has no rhyme in General American, but many in RP. Words may also have more than one pronunciation, one with a rhyme, and one without.

Words with obscure perfect rhymes
This list includes rhymes of words that have been listed as rhymeless.

aitch  rhymes with dialectal nache (the bony point on the rump of an ox or cow), Rach, a hypocoristic for the name Rachel, one pronunciation of obsolete rache (a streak down a horse's face), and the surname of Anne Heche.
 angst  rhymes with manxed and wangst, self-indulgent self-pity (a portmanteau of wank and angst); phalanxed is not a perfect rhyme because the stress is on the wrong syllable. The alternative American pronunciation  has no rhymes.
 arugula  rhymes with Bugula, a genus of bryozoan, in American English.
 beige  rhymes with greige, a colour between grey and beige.
 blitzed  rhymes with spritzed, from spritz, to squirt with water or mist.
 boing, -s  rhymes with doing (etymology 2), the sound made by an elastic object when struck by or striking a hard object, and toing/toings, the sound of a metallic vibration.
 bombed  rhymes with glommed, American slang for 'attached'.
 cairn rhymes with bairn, a Northern English and Scottish word meaning child.
 chaos  rhymes with naos, the inner chamber of a temple.
 chocolate  rhymes with auklet, any of the smaller species of auks, in General American, in which the vowel in the accented syllable is pronounced /ɑ/ in both words.
 circle  rhymes with hurkle, to pull in all one's limbs; novercal, like a stepmother; squircle, a geometric shape resembling a square with rounded edges (e.g., Lamé's special quartic); opercle, an opercular bone; and the surnames of Angela Merkel (as pronounced in English), Studs Terkel, and Steve Urkel.
 circus  rhymes with murcous, having cut off one's thumb; and Quercus, a genus of oak.
 cleansed  rhymes with lensed, "provided with a lens or lenses".
 coif  rhymes with boyf, slang for "boyfriend".
 doth  rhymes with Cuth, a hypocoristic for the name Cuthbert, as in "Cuth's Day" at St. Cuthbert's Society.
 else  rhymes with wels, the fish Silurus glanis; and Chels, a hypocoristic for the name Chelsea.
 eth  rhymes with Castilian Spanish merced, 'gift', which is occasionally used in English.
 fiends  rhymes with teinds, Scottish word for the portion of an estate assessed for the stipend of the clergy, and archaic Scottish piends.
 film, -s  rhymes with pilm, Scottish word for dust.  The plural films rhymes with Wilms, a German surname and a kidney tumor
 flange  rhymes with Ange, a hypocoristic for the name Angela.
 fourths  rhymes with North's, belonging to someone named North (such as Oliver North or Kanye West and Kim Kardashian's daughter North West).
 fugue, -s  rhymes with jougs, which is rarely found in the singular; one pronunciation of Moog, the synthesizer brand name; Droog, the sister catalogue to Delia*s for boys; zhoug, a green Yemeni sauce; doogh, a savory Persian yogurt drink; cheug, a slang term for a person who has an outdated idea of what is trendy; the boog, short for the boogaloo movement; and Zoog Disney. The plural rhymes with the name of Zoogz Rift.
 grilse  rhymes with fils (etymology 2), a hundredth or thousandth of the monetary units of many Arab countries.
Sulfs), any of a number of sulfate-regulating enzymes.
 kiln, -s, if pronounced , rhymes with the surname Milne. The plural rhymes with Milne's, belonging to someone with the surname Milne.
 loge  rhymes with the English pronunciation of Limoges, a city in France, and a kind of porcelain.
 midst  rhymes with didst, the archaic second-person singular for did (used with thou).
 month  rhymes with oneth, a mathematical term; also en-plus-oneth (n + 1)th and hundred-and-oneth (= hundred-and-first). This also appears in fractions and so takes the plural, as in twenty thirty-oneths.
 music  rhymes with anchusic, as in anchusic acid; dysgeusic, having a disorder that causes alterations in one's sense of taste; ageusic, lacking a sense of taste; and sheltopusik, a lizard of Europe and Central Asia.
 neutron , in American English, rhymes with Lutron, an electronics company based in Coopersburg, Pennsylvania.
 ninja, -s  rhymes with Rohingya, a minority group in Myanmar, and Shinja, a Christian who practices martial arts (in rhotic accents such as General American; in non-rhotic accents such as RP, these words also rhyme with ginger, injure, etc.).
 oblige  rhymes with Nige, a hypocoristic for the name Nigel.
 oink, -s  rhymes with yoink/yoinks, a colloquial interjection expressing the stealing or sudden acquisition of something; boink/boinks, a slang word meaning "to have sex with"; and Spoink, a Pokémon species introduced in Generation III.
 opus (with a short 0), rhymes with Hoppus, a method of measuring timber and surname of Mark Hoppus, lead singer of Blink-182; and, in American English, one pronunciation of tapas, Mexican finger food.
 orange , rhymes with "door hinge" in certain accents and Blorenge, a hill in Wales. Webster's Third gives two pronunciations for sporange, one of which rhymes. However, one is a spelling pronunciation based on orange, and the OED only has the non-rhyming pronunciation, with the stress on the ange : . The American pronunciation of orange with one syllable has no rhyme, even in non-rhotic accents.
 pint  rhymes with rynt, a word milkmaids use to get a cow to move.
 plagued  rhymes with vagued, meaning "wandered/roamed" or "became vague/acted vaguely".
 plankton  rhymes with Yankton, a member of a western branch of the Dakota people and several American place names named after the people.
 plinth  rhymes with synth, colloquial for synthesizer.
 poem , in American English, rhymes with the Hebrew names Noam, Jeroboam and Rehoboam; no'm, a dialectal contraction for "no, ma'am"; or with phloem (/ˈfləʊ.əm/) (pronunciations vary).
 poet  rhymes with coit, to have sex.
 purple  rhymes with curple, the hindquarters of a horse or donkey, hirple, to walk with a limp, nurple, the act of roughly twisting a nipple (slang).
 quaich  rhymes with scraich/scraigh, Scots for "to screech", and one pronunciation of abeigh, a rare Scottish word meaning "cautiously aloof". 
 rhythm  rhymes with smitham, fine malt or ore dust.
 rouged  rhymes with luged, having ridden on a luge.
 silver  rhymes with chilver, a female lamb.
 siren  rhymes with gyron, a type of triangle in heraldry; environ, meaning to encircle or surround; the given names Byron and Myron; and apeiron, meaning infinity.
 soldier  rhymes with the surnames Bolger and Folger sylph rhymes with MILF/milf, vulgar slang; and Wilf, a hypocorism for the name Wilfred.
 thesp  rhymes with hesp, a measure of two hanks of linen thread in Scotland; and Cresp, a French surname.
 toilet  rhymes with oillet, an eyelet.
 torsk  rhymes with Norsk, a rural locality in Russia
 tufts rhymes with scufts, the third-person singular form of the dialectal verb scuft.
 waltzed  rhymes with schmaltzed, as in "schmaltzed up" (see schmaltz).
 wasp rhymes with knosp, "an ornament in the form of a bud or knob".
 wharves  rhymes with dwarves, the variant of dwarfs usually used in fantasy of the Tolkienian model.
 width  rhymes with obsolete sidth, meaning length.
 woman  rhymes with toman (some pronunciations), a Persian coin and military division.
 yttrium  rhymes with liberum arbitrium, a legal term.

 Non-rhyming English words 

The majority of words with antepenultimate stress, such as ambulance, citizen, dangerous and obvious, and with preantepenultimate stress, such as (un)necessary, logarithm, algorithm and sacrificing, have no rhyme.

Masculine rhymes

Refractory one-syllable rhymes are uncommon; there may be fewer than a hundred in English. A great many end in a present or historical suffix -th, or are plural or participle forms. This list includes a few polysyllabic masculine rhymes such as obliged, which have one syllable in their rhyming part.

 adzed 
 airt (rhymes with the Scots pronunciations of a number of other words, e.g. "pairt", a Scots variant of "part")
 alb /-ælb/ (rhymes with some pronunciations of the proper noun "Kalb" in the name of Johann de Kalb)
 amongst /-ʌŋst/ ("quincunxed" could qualify as a rhyme if its second syllable is given secondary stress and if secondary stress is considered sufficient for a perfect rhyme)
 angsts 
 bilge 
 boinged 
 borscht  (could rhyme with a dialectal North American pronunciation of "washed" as "worshed/warshed")
 borshch /- ɔrʃtʃ/ (pronunciation variant of the above)
 breadth, -s 
 bronzed 
 bulb, -s, -ed  
 calced  (may rhyme with "valsed" in British English, according to the Oxford English Dictionary)
 combs (combinations) 
 coolth 
 corpsed 
 culm 
 delft 
 depth, -s  
 dreamt (sometimes pronounced , causing "dreamt" to rhyme with exempt, tempt, etc.)
 dumbth 
 eighth, -s 
 excerpts (verb) 
 false 
 fifth, -ed, -s 
 filmed  
 glimpsed  
 goonch 
 gouge(d) 
 (en)gulfed  
 kilned  (but not when pronounced as )
 kirsch  
 midsts  
 mulcts  
 ninth, -s 
 obliged 
 obvs 
 oomph 
 pierced 
 prompts  or 
 scarce 
 sculpts 
 sixth, -s 
 sowthed, southed 
 spoilt 
 stilb 
 swoln 
 traipsed 
 twelfth, -s  The "f" in "twelfth" is commonly elided in casual speech, causing "twelfth" to rhyme with "health" and "wealth".
 unbeknownst 
 vuln, -ed, -s 
 warmth 
 whilst  
 wolf, -ed, -s 
 wolve, -d, -s 
 worlds 
 wounds 
 yoicks, joik, -s pork  and forge  have no rhymes in conservative RP. However, the distinction between horse and hoarse has been mostly lost in younger generations, and for them and many others pork which was an exception to the normal rule, now rhymes with fork and cork, while forge now rhymes with gorge. The OED no longer lists  as an alternative pronunciation in its third edition.

Nonce words ending in -ed ('provided with') may produce other potentially refractory masculine rhymes. There are additional words which are only partially assimilated into English, such as Russian kovsh , which are refractory rhymes.

The contraction daren't  has no known rhymes in any English dialect, however the legitimacy of contractions as a single word is disputed. Regardless of this, daren't lacks both perfect rhymes and phrasal rhymes.

Although not meant as a complete list, there are some additional refractory rhymes in GA.
 heighth, -s 
 iron 
 karsts 

Feminine rhymes
For feminine rhymes, the final two syllables must match to count as a rhyme. Once the stress shifts to the penultimate syllable, rhymeless words are quite common, perhaps even the norm: there may be more rhymeless words than words with rhymes. The following words are representative, but there are thousands of others.

 angel         
 angry         
 anxious     
 chimney     
 comment     
 elbow         
 empty         
 engine       
 foible       
 foyer hundred(th) 
 husband     
 liquid       
 luggage     
 monster     
 nothing     
 olive         
 penguin     
 polka         
 problem     
 sanction   
 sandwich   
 secret       
 something 
 zigzag''

See also
List of closed pairs of English rhyming words

Notes

External links
 Slant rhymes for words without perfect rhymes

Rhyme
Rhyme